Ashley Gardner (born April 11, 1964) is a South African-born American actress. She provided the voices of Nancy Gribble and Didi Hill in the animated series King of the Hill.

Career
She appeared in the sitcom Seinfeld in the episode "The Library" as Marion; and in the pilot of Madman of the People.

John Simon in his review of Keith Curran's 1991 play Walking the Dead , stated that Gardner "does wonders" as Veronica, a lesbian who has a sex change and becomes a man. She had previously appeared in Curran's Dalton's Back and co-starred in Timothy Mason's The Fiery Furnace.

Gardner has also appeared in the feature films  Heart of Dixie (1989), Johnny Suede (1991) and He Said, She Said (1991) where she plays the "Classy with a capital K" ex-lover of Kevin Bacon's character who flirts by exposing her breast for him in public.

Filmography

Film

Television

References

External links

1964 births
Living people
American film actresses
American stage actresses
American television actresses
American voice actresses
South African film actresses
South African stage actresses
South African television actresses
South African voice actresses
21st-century American women